Helena Coleman (April 27, 1860 – December 7, 1953) was a Canadian poet, music teacher, and writer.

Early life
Helena Jane Coleman was born in Newcastle, Ontario, the daughter of the Rev. Francis Coleman, a Methodist minister, and his second wife, Jane C. Gould. Her English-born mother died in 1862. One of her five older half-brothers was geologist Arthur Philemon Coleman. (Her father's first wife, Emmeline Maria Adams Coleman, was a descendant of John Quincy Adams, and sister of educator Mary Electa Adams.)

She attended Ontario Ladies' College in Whitby, Ontario, with further study in Germany.

Career
Coleman taught piano at Ontario Ladies' College from 1880 to 1892, as head of the music department, while her brothers' aunt Mary Electa Adams was the principal. There she was a friend and colleague of Margaret Addison, who became a dean of the school. Coleman was also a friend of New Zealand writer Edith Joan Lyttelton, during her stays in Canada. Coleman was a mentor to Canadian poet Marjorie Pickthall. Her friendship with fellow Canadian poet Ethelwyn Wetherald was especially intimate.

Coleman's poems appeared under dozens of pseudonyms (using masculine, feminine, and indeterminate names) in many Canadian and American magazines, including Atlantic Monthly, Collier's, and Ladies' Home Journal, until 1906, when she published Songs and Sonnets (1906) under her own name, by the Tennyson Club of Toronto. Further poetry collections were Marching Men: War Verses (1917) and Songs (1937). Her stories and articles continued to appear under various pseudonyms. Another book by her, Sheila and Others (1920), was a collection of short stories and bore the byline "Winifred Cotter". She was a member of the Canadian Authors Association, and of the University Women's Club of Toronto.

Personal life
Helena Coleman used crutches that she called her "helpers", after surviving polio in childhood. After 1928 she used a wheelchair. Coleman lived most of her life in Toronto with her brother Arthur, and with a niece, Helen Coleman. She died in 1953, aged 93 years, in Toronto. Her papers are archived in the E. J. Pratt Library at Victoria University.

References

External links

 Poems by Coleman at Sonnets.org.
 Coleman in SFU Digitized Collections, Simon Fraser University, Coll. Canada's Early Women Writers (with a photograph)

1860 births
1953 deaths
Canadian women poets
19th-century Canadian poets
20th-century Canadian poets
Canadian women in World War I
Canadian people of English descent
People from Clarington
Writers from Ontario
People with polio
Canadian music educators
19th-century Canadian women writers
20th-century Canadian women writers
Women music educators